Give Me Life (German: Schenk mir das Leben) is a 1928 German silent drama film directed by Klaus Fery and starring Grete Reinwald, Henry Stuart and Elizza La Porta.

The film's sets were designed by the art director Willi Herrmann.

Cast
 Grete Reinwald 
 Henry Stuart
 Elizza La Porta 
 Jules Massaro 
 Grit Haid 
 Jakob Tiedtke 
 Olga Limburg
 Robert Scholz 
 Gertrud Arnold 
 Harry Frank
 Julietta Brandt 
 Victor Colani 
 Hugo Döblin 
 Maria Forescu 
 Stefanie Hantzsch 
 Antonie Jaeckel 
 Oskar Karlweis 
 Hilde Maroff 
 Sylvia Torf
 Helen von Münchofen 
 Sascha von Wanowska 
 Hedwig Wangel 
 Geza L. Weiss

References

Bibliography
 Gerhard Lamprecht. Deutsche Stummfilme: 1927-1931.

External links

1928 films
Films of the Weimar Republic
German silent feature films
1928 drama films
German drama films
German black-and-white films
Silent drama films
1920s German films